Wuwei is a county-level city in the southeast of Anhui Province, China, under the jurisdiction of the prefecture-level city of Wuhu. Previously a county, Wuwei was upgraded to a county-level city in late 2019.

Administrative divisions
Wuwei directly administers the following 20 towns:

Climate

Urbanization 
On December 16, 2019, the State Council approved re-designating Wuwei from a county to a county-level city, due to the area's increasing urbanization. Eight months later, The Economist commented on the urbanization, describing that "at the heart of Wuwei, high-rise housing and a glossy white shopping centre sit next to dilapidated alleys where farmers sell live chickens".

Economy 
In 2018, the city recorded a GDP of 438.2 billion yuan, and retail sales totaling 129.5 billion yuan.

References

External links
Official website of Wuwei Government

County-level divisions of Anhui
Wuhu